Mauritius competed in the 2014 Commonwealth Games in Glasgow, Scotland from July 23 to August 3, 2014. Mauritius has 60 athletes competing in these games.

Medalists

Athletics

Men

Field Events

Combined events – Decathlon

Women
Track & road events

Field events

Badminton

Mixed team

Pool F

Boxing

Mauritius has six men and two women

Cycling

Mountain biking

Road

Women

Judo

Men

Women

Squash

Mauritius has two squash athletes entered.

Individual

Doubles

Swimming

Men

Women

Table Tennis

Triathlon

Mixed Relay

Weightlifting

Men

Women

Wrestling

Men's freestyle

F — Won by fall

References

Nations at the 2014 Commonwealth Games
Mauritius at the Commonwealth Games
Com